The J18 Region (Elit until-2020) is the highest level of under-18 ice hockey in Sweden. The league was first played in the 1980 season. Färjestad BK has won the most league titles, with seven.

The league is divided into four divisions, Norra (North), Södra (South), Västra (West), and Östra (East). These divisions are played from September to December during the year. The five best teams from each division qualify for the Winter series known as J18 Allsvenskan, divided into Norra and Södra, while the remaining teams have to play in a continuation series during Winter for their specific division. These "Winter" series are played between January and March of the following year.

J18 Region was expected to become the second highest under-18 league as J18 Allsvenskan would have become a new division in the 2012–13 season to be played for the entire season; however, this league restructuring has been postponed until the 2013–14 season, and J18 Allsvenskan continues to be a Winter series and part of J18 Region for at least the 2012–13 season.

2011/12 teams

Norra 

Asplöven HC
IF Björklöven
Clemensnäs HC
Kramfors-Alliansen
Luleå HF
Modo Hockey
Skellefteå AIK
IF Sundsvall Hockey
Tegs SK
Timrå IK
Örnsköldsviks HF
Östersunds IK

Södra 
Borås HC
Frölunda HC
HV71
Linköpings HC
Malmö Redhawks
Mariestad BoIS HC
Nässjö HC
Rögle BK
Skövde IK
Tingsryds AIF
IF Troja/Ljungby
Växjö Lakers HC

Västra 
IFK Arboga IK
Bofors IK
Brynäs IF
Falu IF
Färjestad BK
Grums IK Hockey
Leksands IF
Mora IK
Sunne IK
Valbo HC
VIK Västerås HK
Örebro HK

Östra 
AIK
Almtuna IS
Djurgårdens IF
Enköpings SK
Flemingsbergs IK
Huddinge IK
Lidingö Vikings HC
Nacka HK
Nyköpings HK
Nynäshamns IF
SDE Hockey
Södertälje SK

References
Swedenhockey.se

8
Junior ice hockey in Sweden